Proverbs 1 is the first chapter of the Book of Proverbs in the Hebrew Bible or the Old Testament of the Christian Bible. The book is a compilation of several wisdom literature collections, with the heading in 1:1 may be intended to regard Solomon as the traditional author of the whole book, but the dates of the individual collections are difficult to determine, and the book probably obtained its final shape in the post-exilic period. This chapter is a part of the first collection of the book.

Text
The original text is written in Hebrew language. This chapter is divided into 33 verses.

Textual witnesses
Some early manuscripts containing the text of this chapter in Hebrew are of the Masoretic Text, which includes the Aleppo Codex (10th century), and Codex Leningradensis (1008). Fragments containing parts of this chapter in Hebrew were found among the Dead Sea Scrolls including 4Q102 (4QProv; 30 BCE – 30 CE) with extant verses 27–33.

There is also a translation into Koine Greek known as the Septuagint, made in the last few centuries BC; some extant ancient manuscripts of this version include Codex Vaticanus (B; B; 4th century), Codex Sinaiticus (S; BHK: S; 4th century), and Codex Alexandrinus (A; A; 5th century).

Analysis
This chapter opens a section regarded as the first collection in the book of Proverbs (comprising Proverbs 1–9), known as "Didactic discourses". The Jerusalem Bible describes chapters 1–9 as a prologue of the chapters 10–22:16, the so-called "[actual] proverbs of Solomon", as "the body of the book". 
The chapter has the following structure:
Introduction (1:1–7)
Avoid Evil Men! (1:8–19)
Wisdom's First Speech (1:20–33)

Introduction (1:1–7)
This section provides the purpose and value of the whole book, especially the basis of its teaching. The five purpose clauses of the collection of proverbs in general are listed in verses 1:2a, 2b, 3a, 4a, 6a of the opening section.

Verse 1
The proverbs of Solomon, son of David, king of Israel:
"Proverb": from Hebrew noun , mashal, can refer to "an object lesson based on or using a comparison or analogy", also can be "a short pithy statement" (Ezekiel 16:44), "object lesson drawn from experience" (Psalm 78:2-6), "saying or by-word" (Deuteronomy 28:37), or "an oracle of future blessing" (Ezekiel 21:1-5).
"The Proverbs of Solomon": a phrase that is considered the title for the entire book, although it does not mean that Solomon authored or collected all the proverbs in this book, because some sections are collections bearing the names different authors, such as the "sayings of the wise" (Proverbs 22:17–24:22), "more sayings of the wise" (Proverbs 24:23-34), "the words of Agur" (Proverbs 30:1–33) and "the words of Lemuel" (Proverbs 31:1-9). The book might not be in its final canonical form in the days of Solomon, because there is a note in it that "the men of Hezekiah" added a collection of Solomonic proverbs to the existing form of the book (Proverbs 25:1-29:27).

Verse 2
To know wisdom and instruction; to perceive the words of understanding;
"To know" from a Hebrew stative verb , yadaʿ, which can mean "to come to know” or "to become wise in".
"Wisdom” from Hebrew noun , khokhmah, which basically means 'skill, ability' and could be nuanced “moral skill.” The term refers to “skill” that produces something of value, such as the manual skills of craftsmen (35:35; cf. Isaiah 40:20), the navigational skills of sailors (Ezekiel 27:8), abilities of weavers, or capabilities of administrators (1 Kings 3:28).  refers to the statutes and laws given by God as Israel’s wisdom. To learn about wisdom means 'to become equipped with the skills necessary to live a good and successful life'.
"Instruction": The noun (musar, which has a three-fold range of meaning: (1) physical or parental: “discipline; chastisement” (including that from God) (2) verbal: “warning; exhortation” and (3) moral: “training; instruction”, such as received under the authority of a parent or teacher (cf. Proverbs 4:1–5). This term is paired with "wisdom" (khokhmah) four times in the book (Proverbs 1:2, 7;).

Verse 7
The fear of the Lord is the beginning of knowledge:
but fools despise wisdom and instruction.
"Fear of the LORD": from the Hebrew phrase , yirʾat YHWH, with "YHWH" (“the Lord”) in form of objective genitive, that is, as the object of "fear and wonder". This expression embraces both reverence for God (cf. Isaiah 8:13) and obedience to him (cf. Deuteronomy 10:12-13; Ecclesiastes 12:13); stated here as the prerequisite of true wisdom with a repetition in 9:10 as a literary inclusion for the section comprising Proverbs 1–9, forming a central theme of the book.
“Fear": from the Hebrew term , yirʾah, originated from the root , yare, which has a three-fold range of meanings: (1) “be in dread or terror” (Deuteronomy 1:29; Jonah 1:10), (2) “to stand in awe” (1 Kings 3:28), (3) “to revere; to respect” (Leviticus 19:3); all of these appear in Exodus 20:20. 
"Beginning" may imply first in order (Genesis 1:1; Psalm 111:10; Proverbs 17:14; Micah 1:13), or importance (Proverbs 4:7; Amos 6:1), or the 'best part' (Amos 6:6).

Avoiding evil men (1:8–19)
This section contains the first of several instructions by "a father to his son" throughout the book of Proverbs. The characteristics of these instructions are: 
an appeal for attentiveness (cf. verse 8); 
the directive expressed as a command or prohibition (cf. verses 10b, 15), and 
motivation clauses to heed the directive (cf. verses 9, 16–19).
In contrast to the common practice in the wisdom schools of Egypt and Babylonia, which has a similar setting of instruction by a teacher to the pupils, the parallelism between father and mother (cf. verse 8) indicates that the instructions in the book of Proverbs may have a less formal setting of parental instruction at home. Although bearing constant reminders of parental authority, the motivation clauses appeal more to one's good sense than a duty to obey the parents.

Verse 8

This form of appeal, My son, "is continually repeated throughout these opening chapters". The medieval French rabbi Rashi suggested that the "father" refers to God, the father of mankind, and the "instruction" or "discipline" meant the law which God "gave Moses in writing and orally". Likewise, he suggested that "mother" refers to "your nation, the nation of Israel". Theologian John Gill challenges this:

Wisdom's first speech (1:20–33)
In this passage Wisdom is personified as a woman, who speaks with a divine authority (the basis of this authority is explained in Proverbs 8:22-31). Rejecting Wisdom would mean rejecting "the fear of the Lord" (verse 29), and is reproached with a language in close parallel to prophetic indictments (cf. Isaiah 65:1–2,12; Jeremiah 6:19). On the other hand, those who take heed to Wisdom would enjoy security and peace of mind enjoyed by those who pay heed to Wisdom (verse 33; cf. Proverbs 3:21–26).

See also

Related Bible parts: Proverbs 2, Proverbs 3, Proverbs 9, Proverbs 15

Notes

References

Sources

External links
 Jewish translations:
 Mishlei - Proverbs - Chapter 1 (Judaica Press) translation [with Rashi's commentary] at Chabad.org
 Christian translations:
 Online Bible at GospelHall.org (ESV, KJV, Darby, American Standard Version, Bible in Basic English)
 Book of Proverbs Chapter 1 King James Version
  Various versions

01